Seripah Noli binti Syed Hussin is a Malaysian politician and served as Selangor State Executive Councillor.

Election results

Honours 
  :
  Knight Companion of the Order of Sultan Salahuddin Abdul Aziz Shah (DSSA) – Datin Paduka (2000)

References 

Women members of the Dewan Rakyat
Members of the Dewan Rakyat
Members of the Selangor State Legislative Assembly
Selangor state executive councillors
Women MLAs in Selangor
Living people
United Malays National Organisation politicians
Malaysian people of Malay descent
Malaysian Muslims
21st-century Malaysian women politicians
Western Michigan University alumni
Year of birth missing (living people)